American State Bank was a financial service company operating 37 locations in 21 communities across Texas, mainly in West Texas.

American State Bank first opened on May 20, 1948, in Lubbock.  American State Bank had unusual continuity of management - there were only three presidents since its inception.  The first president, Jack Payne, had a term lasting from the banks first opening until 1974.

American State Bank did not accept any bailout funds from the federal government.

On February 27, 2012, Houston-based Prosperity Bancshares, the parent company of Prosperity Bank, announced that it had signed a merger agreement with ASB, whereby ASB will merge into Prosperity Bank subject to shareholder and regulatory approval.  The merger became final effective July 1, 2012. Prosperity Bancshares ultimately paid over 500 million dollars, through a combination of cash and common stock, to acquire American State Bank.

References

Banks based in Texas
Companies based in Lubbock, Texas
Banks established in 1948
Defunct banks of the United States
1948 establishments in Texas